Bellview is a census-designated place (CDP) in Escambia County, Florida, United States. The population was 23,355 at the 2010 census. It is part of the Pensacola–Ferry Pass–Brent Metropolitan Statistical Area.

Geography
Bellview is
U.S. Route 90, the Mobile Highway, is the main route through the CDP.

Demographics

As of the census of 2000, there were 21,201 people, 8,108 households, and 5,951 families residing in the CDP. The racial makeup of the CDP was 80.66% White, 11.69% African American, 1.08% Native American, 3.28% Asian, 0.16% Pacific Islander, 0.67% from other races, and 2.46% from two or more races. Hispanic or Latino of any race were 2.40% of the population.

There were 8,108 households, out of which 34.3% had children under the age of 18 living with them, 54.4% were married couples living together, 14.8% had a female householder with no husband present, and 26.6% were non-families. 21.4% of all households were made up of individuals, and 7.4% had someone living alone who was 65 years of age or older.  The average household size was 2.61 and the average family size was 3.02.

In the CDP, the population was spread out, with 26.5% under the age of 18, 8.8% from 18 to 24, 29.1% from 25 to 44, 25.2% from 45 to 64, and 10.4% who were 65 years of age or older.  The median age was 36 years. For every 100 females, there were 91.8 males.  For every 100 females age 18 and over, there were 87.8 males.

The median income for a household in the CDP was $38,725, and the median income for a family was $44,693. Males had a median income of $31,160 versus $21,613 for females. The per capita income for the CDP was $18,173.  About 7.6% of families and 10.2% of the population were below the poverty line, including 14.1% of those under age 18 and 9.3% of those age 65 or over.

References

Pensacola metropolitan area
Census-designated places in Escambia County, Florida
Census-designated places in Florida